Mikaella Boulos (born 8 April 1992 Beirut, Lebanon) is a Greco-Cypriot-Lebanese actress and architect. She is known for her role as Dia in the Lebanese comedy series "Aayle A Fared Mayle", and film "Madame Bambino".

Boulos received her Bachelor of Architecture degree from Notre Dame University - Zouk Mosbeh in 2016. In 2017, she started her own architectural business, MIRAJ Architects (MIkaella & RAbih Jrab Architects) with her partner Rabih Jrab. The couple married on 8 September 2017.

Filmography

References 

Living people
Lebanese film actresses
Lebanese television actresses
1992 births
Actresses from Beirut
Lebanese architects
Notre Dame University–Louaize alumni
Women architects